Geeta Zutshi (born 2 December 1956) is a former Indian track and field athlete. She established several national and Asian running records in the 800 metres and 1500 metres events.

Zutshi won the women's silver medals for the 800 m in 1982, and for the 1500 m in both 1978 and 1982. As the top Indian woman athlete at the 1982 Asian Games in New Delhi, she took the oath on behalf of the competitors during the opening ceremony. For her achievements she has been awarded the Arjuna award and the Padma Shri.

She has inspired other Indian women, such as Bachendri Pal, the first Indian woman to successfully climb Mount Everest. As a child, Pal began to aspire to national fame after seeing a newspaper photograph of Zutshi with Prime Minister Indira Gandhi.

She was coached by Mohammad Ilyas Babar. After 17 years in the United States, she returned to India in July, 2002, and took over as coach of the Indian junior athletics team (800 m and 1500 m).

International competitions

See also
 List of Indian sportswomen

References

External links
 

 The Telegraph (India)

Living people
1956 births
Kashmiri people
Kashmiri Pandits
Indian female middle-distance runners
20th-century Indian women
20th-century Indian people
Olympic athletes of India
Athletes (track and field) at the 1980 Summer Olympics
Athletes (track and field) at the 1984 Summer Olympics
Asian Games gold medalists for India
Asian Games silver medalists for India
Asian Games medalists in athletics (track and field)
Athletes (track and field) at the 1978 Asian Games
Athletes (track and field) at the 1982 Asian Games
Medalists at the 1978 Asian Games
Medalists at the 1982 Asian Games
Recipients of the Arjuna Award
Recipients of the Padma Shri in sports
Place of birth missing (living people)